Ian Christie may refer to:

 Ian Christie (musician) (1927–2010), British jazz clarinetist and film critic for the Daily Express
 Ian Christie (film scholar) (born 1945), British film academic
 I. R. Christie (1919–1998), British historian